Abrahámovce is a village and municipality in Bardejov District in the Prešov Region of north-east Slovakia. The municipality lies at an altitude of 265 metres and covers an area of 5.899 km². It has a population of about 342 people. The village is about 99% Slovak. The village has a public library and a football pitch.

Names and etymology
The name comes from a Slavic personal name Obran, later it was incorrectly associated with the biblical Abraham. In the 15th–16th centuries the name was recorded as Abranfalua (one record), Abran (the most frequent version) or Abraham (only from the second half of the 16th century).

See also
 List of municipalities and towns in Slovakia

References

Genealogical resources

The records for genealogical research are available at the state archive "Statny Archiv in Presov, Slovakia"

 Roman Catholic church records (births/marriages/deaths): 1732-1895
 Greek Catholic church records (births/marriages/deaths): 1800-1895
 Lutheran church records (births/marriages/deaths): 1732-1895
 Census records 1869 of Abrahamovce are available at the state archive.

External links
 
 
 https://en.e-obce.sk/obec/abrahamovce/abrahamovce.html
Surnames of living people in Abrahamovce

Villages and municipalities in Bardejov District
Šariš